Fort Union was a frontier fort at Dodgeville, Wisconsin, United States, during the 1832 Black Hawk War. It served as military commander Henry Dodge's headquarters during that war.

History
Henry Dodge, who became known as a military commander during the Black Hawk War first located in Wisconsin in 1827 where he established a lead smelting operation. His settlement became known as Dodgeville and during the 1832 Black Hawk War Fort Union was constructed. Fort Union served as Dodge's headquarters during the war.

References

Union
Union
Buildings and structures in Iowa County, Wisconsin